Locked Out is a 2006 French film directed by and starring Albert Dupontel, and written by him in collaboration with Guillaume Laurant.

Plot
A glue-sniffing homeless person stumbles upon a policeman taking his own life and decides to put his abandoned uniform to good use. Initially this means using it to steal food from the police canteen but soon Roland discovers that wearing the uniform gives him certain powers and responsibilities, particularly tracking down the kidnapped child of a former porn star with whose picture he had fallen in love.

Cast

 Albert Dupontel: Roland
 Claude Perron: Marie
 Nicolas Marié: Duval-Riché
 Hélène Vincent: Madame Duval
 Roland Bertin: Monsieur Duval
 Yolande Moreau: Gina
 Bouli Lanners: Youssouf
 Bruno Lochet: M'Burundé
 Serge Riaboukine: Jean-Pierre Lascoumes
 Philippe Duquesne: The Indian
 Lola Arnaud: Coquelicot
 Dominique Bettenfeld: Sergeant Kur
 Jackie Berroyer: The sex-shop customer
 Edouard Montoute: The bus-driver
 Terry Gilliam: "fake baby" homeless person
 Terry Jones: homeless person
 Gustave de Kervern: The policeman

References

External links
 

2000s French-language films
2006 films
French comedy films
Films directed by Albert Dupontel
2000s French films